Saleh Mohammad may refer to:

 Saleh Mohammad (Afghan politician)
 Saleh Mohammad (Indian politician) (born 1977)
 Saleh Mohammad (swimmer) (born 1986), Syrian swimmer
 Saleh Mohammad (snooker player) (born 1973), snooker player from Afghanistan
 Saleh Mohammed (weightlifter) (born 1965), Iraqi competitor in weightlifting at the 1986 Asian Games